Hāpūpū / JM Barker National Historic Reserve is one of four national reserves in New Zealand. The reserve is located close to Hanson Bay at the north-eastern end of Chatham Island, the main island of the Chatham Islands, and was created in 1979 following a gift of land from a local business. This was done to protect 33 hectares of kopi (karaka or Corynocarpus laevigatus) forest containing Moriori tree carvings called momori-rakau (or dendroglyphs). In 1996, the reserve was officially designated as a national historic reserve, owing to the site's significance as a representation of Moriori traditions.

History 
Hāpūpū was given to the New Zealand government in 1979 by Barker Bros (Brothers AND Sisters) Ltd.
It is one of only two national historic reserves in New Zealand (the other being the Puhi Kai Iti / Cook Landing Site National Historic Reserve at Kaiti, Gisborne). The historic reserve designation reflects the particular importance of Hāpūpū culturally and spiritually for the Moriori of Rēkohu (the Chatham Islands).

The momori rakau are among the few remaining visible signs of pre-European-contact Moriori culture. The carvings depict Moriori karapuna (ancestors) and symbols of the natural world, such as patiki (flounder) and the hopo (albatross). In a late 1998 review, 82 trees with carvings were found. 
Numbers of momori rakau have been steadily declining due to the aging of the host trees, stock grazing, wind and, in earlier years, people removing the carvings as souvenirs.

The reserve was fenced in 1980 to provide protection for the tree carvings from grazing stock and this is now showing very good recovery.
Planning is underway between the Department of Conservation (DOC) and the Moriori people to secure a small portion of the reserve for contemporary Moriori carvers to begin a new generation of momori-rakau.

Barker Bros recently sold most of their remaining farmland, including that which surrounds Hāpūpū, to Hokotehi Moriori Trust, the mandated body responsible for Moriori assets, acquisitions and negotiations.

The momori rakau have been the subject of much debate throughout the years mainly about the purpose behind them. One author has even released a book in 2007 in which he broadly claims that the carvings depict mainly birds and has even given these carvings a new name "manu -moriori" which could be translated to mean bird people. Chatham Island Moriori representatives are not supportive of the release or sale of this book as it is another example of someone making money out of the cultural and intellectual property rights of Moriori.
Moriori do not consider themselves to be 'Bird People" either, but can rightfully claim synergy with the creations of nature all around them. Moriori have been the guardians of Rēkohu since the dawn of time and were doing a good job until they were interrupted in 1791 by a European 'discovery.'
The only recorded example of a Moriori committing a carving to a tree on the Chatham Islands dates back to the 1840s, when a Moriori carved a tree on Pitt Island after burying his murdered wife and child next to it.  This example also has no relevance to birds.

References

External links 
 Moriori education resources
 Pitt Island Pictures
 J.M. Barker (Hapupu) National Historic Reserve at the Department of Conservation website

Moriori
Geography of the Chatham Islands
Protected areas of New Zealand
Chatham Island